Selwan Sinan Chasib Al-Jaberi (born 4 May 1991) is a Swedish-Iraqi professional footballer who plays as a forward for Ranong United in Thai League 2.

Club career

Lampang FC
On the 2021 season, he signed for Thai League 2 club Lampang FC. He made his league debut on 4 September 2021 in a match against Muangkan United.

Persela Lamongan
In 2022, Selwan signed a contract with Indonesian Liga 1 club Persela Lamongan. He made his league debut on 15 January 2022 in a match against Persija Jakarta at the Kapten I Wayan Dipta Stadium, Gianyar.

Al-Hudood
In August 2022, Al-Jaberi signed for Al-Hudood, a team based in his country of origin, Iraq.

References

External links

Thaileague Official Website: Grand Andaman Ranong United F.C. Players

1991 births
Living people
Iraqi footballers
Swedish footballers
Swedish people of Iraqi descent
Association football midfielders
FC Linköping City players
Selwan Al-Jaberi
Kelantan United F.C. players
Selwan Al-Jaberi
Persela Lamongan players
Selwan Al-Jaberi
Malaysia Premier League players
Liga 1 (Indonesia) players
Expatriate footballers in Thailand
Expatriate footballers in Malaysia
Iraqi expatriate sportspeople in Malaysia
Expatriate footballers in Indonesia
Expatriate sportspeople in Indonesia
Footballers from Stockholm